Taylor Decker (born August 23, 1993) is an American football offensive tackle for the Detroit Lions of the National Football League (NFL). He played college football at Ohio State.

Early years
Decker attended Butler High School in Vandalia, Ohio. He was a three-year starter for the football team as a left tackle. He was rated by Rivals.com as a four-star recruit and was ranked as the 23rd-best offensive tackle in his class. He originally committed to the University of Notre Dame to play college football but changed to Ohio State University. In addition to football, Decker played basketball in high school.

College career
Decker played in all 12 games as a true freshman in the 2012 season. He played mostly special teams, but played 22 snaps on offense. Decker took over as a starter his sophomore season in the 2013 season, starting all 14 games at the right tackle position. Decker moved from right tackle to left tackle his junior year in 2014 and was the Buckeyes only returning starter on the offensive line. He started all 15 games, including the 2015 College Football Playoff National Championship victory over Oregon.

Professional career

Decker was drafted in the first round with the 16th overall pick by the Detroit Lions in the 2016 NFL Draft.

On May 6, 2016, the Detroit Lions signed Decker to a fully guaranteed four-year, $10.96 million contract with a signing bonus of $6.17 million. Decker started all 16 games at the left tackle position in his rookie season and was the only player besides quarterback Matthew Stafford to play every snap on offense for the Lions. Decker was named the Lions Rookie of the Year for 2016 in voting by the Detroit Sports Broadcasters Association.

On June 6, 2017, it was revealed that Decker had undergone shoulder surgery, and was ruled out for four to six months. He was placed on the physically unable to perform list to start the 2017 season. He was activated off PUP on November 11, 2017, and started the final eight games of the season at left tackle.

On December 2, 2018, Decker caught a touchdown pass from Lions quarterback Matthew Stafford, when celebrating for the touchdown he threw the football into the stands. After the game Decker tweeted that this touchdown was his first touchdown ever, and he had been playing football since the first grade, and requested that he could get in contact with the fan who caught it. On December 3, 2018, Decker was put in contact with the fan that caught it and got his first ever touchdown ball back.

On April 29, 2019, the Lions exercised the fifth-year option on Decker's contract.

On September 1, 2020, Decker signed a five-year, $70.35 million contract extension with the Lions. Decker revealed in an interview with Pardon My Take, that he played the start of the 2020 season with appendicitis.

On September 11, 2021, Decker was placed on injured reserve after undergoing finger surgery. He was activated on November 2, 2021.

On January 2, 2022, in a game against the Seattle Seahawks, Decker scored his 2nd career touchdown on a pass from Tim Boyle.

References

External links
 Detroit Lions bio
 Ohio State Buckeyes bio

1993 births
Living people
People from Vandalia, Ohio
Players of American football from Ohio
American football offensive tackles
Ohio State Buckeyes football players
All-American college football players
Detroit Lions players